Tadkal  is a town in kangti mandal of the Sangareddy district in the south Indian state of Telangana.

Demographics
As of 2001 India census, Tadkal had a population of 6286 with 3138 males and 3148 females.

See also
 [Telangana]
 Districts of Sangareddy

References

External links
 http://Koppal.nic.in/

Villages in Koppal district